Stephen Johns may refer to:

Stephen Johns (curler) (born 1965), Australian curler
Stephen Johns (ice hockey) (born 1992), American ice hockey defenceman
Stephen Johns (music producer), Grammy Award winning classical music producer
Steve Johns (drummer) (born 1960), American jazz drummer

See also
Stephen John (disambiguation)
John Stephens (disambiguation)